Mount Dudley is an Antarctic mountain over  high, standing at the head of Neny Fjord and bounded on the north and east sides by Neny Glacier, on the west coast of Graham Land. The west side of this mountain was first roughly surveyed in 1936 by the British Graham Land Expedition under John Rymill. It was surveyed in entirety in 1940 by the United States Antarctic Service. The feature was photographed from the air and ground by the Ronne Antarctic Research Expedition (RARE) of 1947–48 under Finn Ronne, who named it for Harold M. Dudley, the executive secretary of the American Council of Commercial Laboratories, Inc. in Washington, D.C. who procured various types of equipment and arranged financial aid for RARE.

References 

Mountains of Graham Land
Fallières Coast